Kai Verbij (born 25 September 1994) is a Dutch speed skater who is specialized in the sprint distances. His mother is Japanese, while his father is Dutch.

Career
Together with Ronald Mulder and Stefan Groothuis, Verbij won the team sprint event at the 2015–16 ISU Speed Skating World Cup event in Calgary on 14 November 2015. In January 2016 he won the title at the KNSB Dutch Sprint Championships.

Records

Personal records

World records

Tournament overview
Source:

World Cup overview

References

External links

1994 births
Living people
Dutch male speed skaters
Dutch people of Japanese descent
People from Leiderdorp
Olympic speed skaters of the Netherlands
Speed skaters at the 2018 Winter Olympics
Speed skaters at the 2022 Winter Olympics
World Single Distances Speed Skating Championships medalists
World Sprint Speed Skating Championships medalists
Sportspeople from South Holland